Kamilukh is a rural locality (a selo) and the administrative center of Kamilukhsky Selsoviet, Tlyaratinsky District, Republic of Dagestan, Russia. The population was 903 as of 2010. There are 2 streets.

Geography 
Kamilukh is located 44 km southeast of Tlyarata (the district's administrative centre) by road. Genekolob is the nearest rural locality.

References 

Rural localities in Tlyaratinsky District